The Amburayan River is a river in the northeastern portion of island of Luzon in the Philippines. It originates from the Cordillera mountains and traverses the provinces of Benguet, La Union, and Ilocos Sur. With a total length of  where it empties into South China Sea.

The river serves as the boundary between the provinces of Ilocos Sur and La Union.

Source and course
The river's headwaters are a confluence of smaller creeks along the south of barangay Lubo, in Kibungan. Several other tributary creeks merge with the river as it flows along Atok and Kapangan. It then flows along the Sugpon–San Gabriel boundary, the Sugpon–Santol boundary, the Sugpon–Sudipen boundary, the Sudipen–Alilem boundary, the Sudipen–Tagudin boundary, and finally at the Tagudin–Bangar boundary, where its river mouth is located.

In culture 
In the Ilocano epic, Biag ni Lam-ang, the hero Lam-ang came to bathe in the Amburayan, as he was soaked in dirt and blood after a battle with headhunters. Assisted by maidens from a nearby village, he shed the dirt and blood which polluted the river and killed the fish and other animals in the water.

References

Rivers of the Philippines
Landforms of Benguet
Landforms of Ilocos Sur
Landforms of La Union